Andreas Lindberg (born 14 December 1980) is a retired Swedish footballer who played as a goalkeeper.

References

External links

1980 births
Living people
Association football goalkeepers
IFK Norrköping players
GIF Sundsvall players
Allsvenskan players
Superettan players
Swedish footballers
Ranheim Fotball players
Norwegian First Division players
Swedish expatriate footballers
Expatriate footballers in Norway
Swedish expatriate sportspeople in Norway